The 2013 All-Pro Teams were named by the Associated Press (AP) the Pro Football Writers of America (PFWA), and the Sporting News (SN) for performance in the 2013 NFL season. While none of the All-Pro teams have the official imprimatur of the NFL (whose official recognition is nomination to the 2014 Pro Bowl), they are included in the NFL Record and Fact Book. Any player selected to any of the teams can be described as an "All-Pro". The AP team, with first-team and second-team selections, was chosen by a national panel of fifty NFL writers. The Sporting News All-NFL team is voted on by NFL players and executives and was released January 28, 2014. The PFWA team is selected by its more than 300 national members who are accredited media members covering the NFL.

Teams

Key
 AP = Associated Press first-team All-Pro
 AP-t = Tied for first-team All-Pro in the AP vote
 AP-2 = Associated Press second-team All-Pro
 AP-2t = Tied for second-team All-Pro in the AP vote
 PFWA = Pro Football Writers Association All-NFL
 SN = Sporting News All-Pro

Position differences
 AP chose no separate punt returner
 AP chose no separate special teams player
 KR = Kick returner
 PR = Punt returner

Notes

References

All-Pro Teams
All-Pro Team